Ulrich Apt the Elder (1460-1532), was a German Late-Gothic painter.

Biography
Apt was born in Augsburg, and lived and worked there all of his life. He became an independent master in 1481. He ran a workshop in Augsburg with his three sons Jacob, Ulrich Apt the Younger, and Michael, all artists, producing primarily religious themed works. He died in Augsburg in 1532.

References

15th-century German painters
German male painters
16th-century German painters
1532 deaths
1460 births
Gothic painters
Artists from Augsburg